The list of shipwrecks in 1879 includes ships sunk, foundered, grounded, or otherwise lost during 1879.

January

February

March

April

May

June

July

August

September

October

November

December

Unknown date

References

Notes

Bibliography
 

1879